Yin Yong (born August 1969) is a Chinese banker and politician who is the mayor of Beijing, in office since 28 October 2022. Previously, he served as deputy party secretary of Beijing, vice mayor of Beijing, and vice governor of People's Bank of China.

He is a representative of the 20th National Congress of the Chinese Communist Party and a member of the 20th Central Committee of the Chinese Communist Party.

Biography
Yin was born in Caidian District of Wuhan, Hubei, in August 1969. He also holds a Master of Public Administration from Harvard University.

Yin joined the Chinese Communist Party (CCP) in May 1994, and began his political career in January 1997, when he was despatched to the Reserve Management Department of the State Administration of Foreign Exchange. He also served as general manager of China Investment Corporation (Singapore) between 2001 and 2002.

On 19 August 2015, Yin was named assistant governor of the People's Bank of China, and was elevated to vice governor on 27 December 2016, becoming the youngest vice governor and governor in the history of the People's Bank of China.

On 19 January 2018, Yin was appointed vice mayor of Beijing, and ten months later was admitted to member of the Standing Committee of the CCP Beijing Municipal Committee, the capital city's top authority. In June 2022, he was made deputy party secretary of Beijing, in addition to serving as acting mayor since 28 October. On 19 January 2023, he was formally elected as the mayor by the Beijing Municipal People's Congress.

References

1969 births
Living people
People from Wuhan
Tsinghua University alumni
Harvard University alumni
People's Republic of China politicians from Hubei
Chinese Communist Party politicians from Hubei
Members of the 20th Central Committee of the Chinese Communist Party